Mark Wunderlich (born 1968), is an American poet. He was born in Winona, Minnesota, and grew up in a rural setting near the town of Fountain City, Wisconsin.  He attended Concordia College's Institute for German Studies before transferring to the University of Wisconsin, where he studied English and German literature.  After moving to New York City he attended Columbia University, where he received an MFA (Master of Fine Arts) degree.

Wunderlich has published four collections of poetry, most recently God of Nothingness (Graywolf Press, 2021). He worked on his first book, The Anchorage, (University of Massachusetts Press, 1999) as his MFA thesis at Columbia University and finished it while living in Provincetown, Massachusetts. There he was friends with the poet Stanley Kunitz (1905–2006). A second book of poems, Voluntary Servitude, was published by Graywolf Press in 2004.

Life
Wunderlich has published individual poems, essays, reviews and interviews in the Paris Review, Yale Review, Slate, Fence, Boston Review, Chicago Review,  and AGNI. Wunderlich has taught at Stanford, San Francisco State University, Ohio University, Barnard College, and Columbia University. Since 2004, he has been a member of the literature faculty at Bennington College in Vermont, where he is also Director of the Graduate Writing Seminars.  He lives in New York's Hudson River Valley near the town of Catskill.

Bibliography

Poetry 
Collections
 
 
 
 

List of poems

Honors and awards
 Lambda Literary Award for The Anchorage (1999)
 two fellowships from the Fine Arts Work Center in Provincetown
 Wallace Stegner Fellowship from Stanford University
 Writers at Work Award
 Jack Kerouac Prize
 Poetry Fellowship from the National Endowment for the Arts
 Poetry Fellowship from the Massachusetts Cultural Council
 Fellowship from the Amy Lowell Trust
 Editor's Prize from the Missouri Review, 2012
 2015 Rilke Prize from the University of North Texas for The Earth Avails

Reviews
Poetry magazine wrote,

Mark Wunderlich's first book, The Anchorage, is a vigorous, necessary attempt to make our words catch up with our changing world: 'This is America--beetles clustered with the harvest, dust roads trundling off at perfect angles, and signs proclaiming unbearable roadside attractions.' The poems are extravagantly -- perhaps I should say fiercely -- autobiographical.

References

External links

 Mark Wunderlich's homepage
 "#12 - Mark Wunderlich", December 25, 2008, Keith, First Book Interviews
 
 Poem: Gebet eines Ehemannes (A Husband's Prayer)
Poems in Periodicals
 "Difficult Body", poets.org
 "Once I Walked Out", thethepoetry.com
 
 
 
 ; reprinted in The Best American Poetry 2010, guest editor Amy Gerstler, series editor David Lehman
 
 
Criticism
 
 

1968 births
Living people
20th-century American male writers
20th-century American poets
21st-century American male writers
21st-century American poets
American LGBT poets
American gay writers
American male poets
Barnard College faculty
Bennington College faculty
Columbia University School of the Arts alumni
Columbia University faculty
Lambda Literary Award for Gay Poetry winners
The New Yorker people
Ohio University faculty
People from Fountain City, Wisconsin
People from Winona, Minnesota
Poets from Minnesota
Poets from Wisconsin
San Francisco State University faculty
Stanford University faculty
University of Wisconsin–Madison College of Letters and Science alumni
Gay poets